Sissela Maria Kyle (born 17 March 1957, in Örgryte, Gothenburg, Sweden) is a Swedish actress and comedian.

Kyle is the second cousin of the British singer Yusuf Islam (formerly Cat Stevens).

Filmography
 1983 – Limpan
 1985 – Lösa förbindelser
 1988 – Liv i luckan
 1999 – Dödlig drift
 2000 – Naken
 2000 – Livet är en schlager
 2001 – Familjehemligheter
 2003 – Kopps
 2003 – Håkan Bråkan
 2004 – Eurovision Song Contest 2004 (In the sketch ABBA: The Last Video)
 2004 – Miss Sweden
 2004 – Bombay Dreams
 2005 – Fyra veckor i juni
 2006 – Min frus förste älskare
 2007 –  Hjälp!
 2007 –  En riktig jul
 2007 –  Sisselak
 2013 – Crimes of Passion
 2013 – Fröken Frimans krig

References

External links 
Sissela Kyle at the Internet Movie Database

1957 births
Living people
People from Gothenburg
Swedish comedians
Swedish actresses
20th-century Swedish women